The Lithium Triangle is a region of the Andes rich in lithium reserves around the borders of Argentina, Bolivia, and Chile. The lithium in the triangle is concentrated in various salt pans that exist along the Atacama Desert and neighboring arid areas, the largest ones including Salar de Uyuni in Bolivia, Salar de Atacama in Chile and Salar del Hombre Muerto in Argentina.

The area is thought to hold around 54% of the world's lithium reserves.

See also

 Lithium production

References

Bibliography
 

Geology of Antofagasta Region
Geology of Atacama Region
Geology of Catamarca Province
Geology of Jujuy Province
Geology of Oruro Department
Geology of Potosí Department
Geology of Salta Province
Geology of Tarapacá Region
Lithium mining